Sérgio Ricardo de Paiva Farias (born 9 June 1967) is a Brazilian football manager is best known for his continental accomplishments during his four-year reign as Pohang Steelers.

Farias won the AFC Champions League with Pohang Steelers in 2009.

Farias won Asia’s Club Manager of the Year in 2010. As well as winning Asia’s best manager, Farias was selected as the best manager in the K-league and gained the award for the Best Manager in East Asia as well.

Coaching career 

After many achievements in Brazil, with big clubs as well as their youth sides - Farias decided to move abroad in seek of a new adventure. That is when Farias and Pohang Steelers in South Korea found each other. Since July 2021, he has been the head coach of Qatar Stars League club Umm Salal SC.

Honours
Brazil U-17

 South American U-17 Championship: 2001

União Barbarense

 Campeonato Brasileiro Série C: 2004

Pohang Steelers

 K League 1: 2007
 Korean FA Cup: 2008
 Korean League Cup: 2009
 AFC Champions League: 2009
 FIFA Club World Cup third place: 2009

Individual

 K League Manager of the Year: 2007

References

1967 births
Living people
Brazilian football managers
Serrano Football Club managers
Clube Atlético Juventus managers
Pohang Steelers managers
Al-Wasl F.C. managers
Al-Ahli Saudi FC managers
Guangzhou City F.C. managers
Duque de Caxias Futebol Clube managers
Sergio Farias
NorthEast United FC managers
Al-Hilal Club (Omdurman) managers
Persija Jakarta managers
Brazilian expatriate football managers
Brazilian expatriate sportspeople in South Korea
Brazilian expatriate sportspeople in Saudi Arabia
Brazilian expatriate sportspeople in China
Brazilian expatriate sportspeople in Thailand
Brazilian expatriate sportspeople in India
Brazilian expatriate sportspeople in Sudan
Brazilian expatriate sportspeople in Egypt
Brazilian expatriate sportspeople in Indonesia
Expatriate football managers in South Korea
Expatriate football managers in Saudi Arabia
Expatriate football managers in China
Expatriate football managers in Thailand
Expatriate football managers in India
Expatriate football managers in Sudan
Expatriate football managers in Egypt
Expatriate football managers in Indonesia
Indian Super League head coaches
Sportspeople from Roraima